Pratikar is a 1991 Indian Hindi-language action drama film directed by T. Rama Rao. It stars Anil Kapoor, Madhuri Dixit in lead roles. The film is a remake of 1987 Bengali film Pratikar, which was also remade in Telugu as Raktha Tilakam and in Tamil as Thaimel Aanai.

Plot
After the court judgment, Narayan Shrivastav (Satyendra Kapoor) was very happy, but he didn't know that his brother Sajjan (Paresh Rawal), thirsty for money, wants to kill him. While they were travelling back to their home, Sajjan kills Narayan. After returning home, he sheds crocodile tears, but Krishna, knowing that his uncle Sajjan is not a good person, doesn't want to stay with him and says that he wants to stay with his late mother's friend and his school teacher Saraswati (Raakhee). At midnight, Sajjan sends a goon to kill Krishna, but by mistake the goon takes the child of Saraswati and throws him in the river, but luckily the inspector arrives there looking for some drug dealers and see a goon throwing something in the river. When he goes to check, he finds an unconscious child, so he takes him to the hospital. Meanwhile, Saraswati thinking his son Suraj is dead, leaves for another city with her daughter Jyoti and Krishna. Now Saraswati looks after Krishna and Jyoti. Time flies and now Krishna (Anil Kapoor) falls in love with his college friend Madhu (Madhuri Dixit). Sajjan's son Raghu (Tej Sapru) turns out to become a local goon, protected by his dad by bribing the local police. Jyoti is raped and murdered by Raghu and his pals, they also run over Saraswati, rendering her crippled. Both Krishna and Saraswati swear to avenge Jyoti's death. Then Suraj (Mohsin Khan) re-enters their lives, as a police inspector, and is bent on arresting Krishna by hook or by crook, casting doubts whether he is or not on the pay-roll of Sajjan.

Cast

 Raakhee as Saraswati 
 Anil Kapoor as Krishna Shrivastav
 Madhuri Dixit as Madhu
 Mohsin Khan as Suraj Singh
 Sonu Walia as Uma Singh
 Paresh Rawal as Sajjan Shrivastav
 Satyendra Kapoor as Narayan Shrivastav
 Satish Shah as Inspector Das
 Om Prakash as Shankar Prasad
 Nirupa Roy as Parvati Prasad
 Aruna Irani as Mrs. Diwani
 Asrani as  Mr. Diwani
 Amita Nangia as Jyoti
 Laxmikant Berde as Bat Shastri
 Tej Sapru as Raghu Shrivastav
 Mahesh Anand as Naag
 Manik Irani as Billa

Music

References

External links 
 

1991 films
Films directed by T. Rama Rao
Films scored by Bappi Lahiri
1990s Hindi-language films
Hindi remakes of Bengali films
Indian films about revenge
Indian rape and revenge films
Indian action drama films